Japanese boy band V6 has released fourteen studio albums, four compilation albums, two extended plays, 53 singles and 22 video albums.

Albums

Studio albums

Compilation albums

Extended plays

Singles

DVD singles

20th Century discography

Studio albums

Compilation albums

Singles

Coming Century discography

Compilation albums

Extended plays

Singles

Notes

References

External links
 Official website

Discographies of Japanese artists
Pop music group discographies